Evans Obeng (born 4 June 1998) is a Ghanaian professional footballer who plays as a midfielder for Ghanaian Premier League side Ashanti Gold.

Career 
Obeng previously played for Berekum Chelsea before moving to Obuasi-based team Ashanti Gold. He played 17 league matches and scored 3 goals in the 2017 Ghanaian Premier League. The following season in 2018 season, he played in 12 league matches before the league was abandoned due to the dissolution of the GFA in June 2018, as a result of the Anas Number 12 Expose. He moved to Ashanti Gold in 2018. He was a member of the squad that featured for the club in the 2020–21 CAF Confederation Cup.

References

External links 
 
 

Living people
1998 births
Association football defenders
Ghanaian footballers
Berekum Chelsea F.C. players
Ghana Premier League players
Ashanti Gold SC players